The following lists events in the year 2019 in Hungary.

Incumbents
President: János Áder
Prime Minister: Viktor Orbán
Speaker of the National Assembly: László Kövér

Events

February 

The Freedom House NGO states that Hungary is no longer a free country, making it the first such country in the European Union to be so designated.

May 
14 May – The Mi Hazánk party announced the party would be forming the National Legion, a uniformed 'self-defense' group similar to Magyar Gárda, the paramilitary wing of the nationalist Jobbik party, which was banned in 2009.
26 May – The 2019 European Parliament election is held in Hungary. Fidesz (EPP) wins the majority of seats, DK (S&D) and Momentum (ALDE) replace Jobbik (NI) and MSZP (S&D) as the main opposition parties.

 29 May – The Hableány disaster: Hotel ship Viking Sigyn collides with and sinks the cruise boat Hableány in Budapest, underneath Margaret Bridge. 28 people die, mostly South Korean tourists.

September 
6 September – The 3rd Budapest Demographic Summit is held in Budapest. Former Prime Minister of Australia (2013-2015) Tony Abbott attend the summit. During the summit Abbott would talk about immigration.

October 

13 October –  The 2019 Hungarian local elections are held. Fidesz loses the mayorship of Budapest to the opposition candidate Gergely Karácsony.

Deaths

January–June
8 January – Antal Bolvári, water polo player, Olympic champion (b. 1932).
12 January – Béla Zsitnik, rower, Olympic bronze medalist (b. 1924).
23 January – Anthony de Jasay, economist and philosopher (b. 1925).
31 January – Kálmán Ihász, footballer (b. 1941).
2 March – János Koós, singer, parodist and actor (b. 1937).
14 March – Ilona Novák, swimmer, Olympic champion (b. 1925).
16 June – Erzsébet Gulyás-Köteles, gymnast, Olympic silver medalist and champion (b. 1924)

July–December
3 October – Márta Balogh, Hungarian handball player (Budapesti Spartacus SC, national team), world champion (1965) (b. 1943)
10 November – István Szívós, Hall of Fame water polo player and Olympic champion (1976) (b. 1948)
9 December – Imre Varga, sculptor and painter (b. 1923)
21 December – Krisztián Zahorecz, footballer (Kaposvári Rákóczi, Szolnoki MÁV, Bajai LSE) (b. 1975)
28 December – Erzsébet Szőnyi, Hungarian composer and music pedagogue, vice-president of the International Society for Music Education (1970–1974) (b. 1924)

See also

 2019 European Parliament election
 List of Hungarian films since 1990

References

 
2010s in Hungary
Years of the 21st century in Hungary
Hungary
Hungary